Decoriana (Decoriensisor Dicensis) was an ancient Roman–Berber city and former bishopric in Tunisia. It is now a Latin Catholic titular see.

History 
Decoriana, in today's Tunisia, was important enough in the Roman province of Byzacena to become one of the many suffragans of its capital Hadrumetum's Metropolitan Archbishop,  yet it was to fade.

Residential bishops 
There are only two known ancient bishops of this diocese.
 Among the Catholic bishops summoned to Carthage in 484 by the Vandal King, Huneric was the Bishop Leander (or Lenzio), who was exiled to Corsica.
 Paschasios (Pascasio), as bishop of Decorianensis in Byzacena, signed the acts of the African council antimonothelite in 646 and subscribed in 645/646 the letter sent from the bishops of Byzacena to the Byzantine emperor Constans II, asking him to persuade the Patriarch of Constantinople, Paul II, to abandon the monothelite heresy; the letter was read out at the Lateran Council in October 649; in the list of signatures his name appears twenty-first: Conc. Lat., p. 77, line 37

Titular see 
The diocese was nominally restored in 1933, as a Latin Catholic titular bishopric Decoriana.

It has had the following incumbents, all of the lowest (episcopal) rank: 
 Felipe Benito Pacheco Condurú, as emeritate (17 Jan 1959 Appointed - 1 Oct 1972 Died); previously Bishop of Ilhéus (Brazil) (1941.04.19 – 1946.02.07), Bishop of Parnaíba (Brazil) (1946.02.07 – 1959.01.17)
 Julius Gábriš (19 Feb 1973 Appointed - 13 Nov 1987 Died), as Apostolic Administrator of the then Apostolic Administration of Trnava (Slovakia) (1973.02.19 – 1977.12.30); later Apostolic Administrator of the Metropolitan Roman Catholic Archdiocese of Trnava (Slovakia) (1977.12.30 – 1987.11.13)
 Max Mariu, S.M. (30 Jan 1988 Appointed - 12 Dec 2005 Died), as Auxiliary Bishop of Hamilton (New Zealand) (1988.01.30 – 2005.12.12) 
 Jan Niemiec (21 Oct 2006 – 27 Oct 2020 Died), as Auxiliary Bishop of Kamyanets-Podilskyi (Ukraine)
 Guillermo Antonio Cornejo Monzón (10 Feb 2021 – present), as Auxiliary Bishop of Lima.

See also 
 Catholic Church in Tunisia

References

External links 
 GCatholic

Catholic titular sees in Africa
Former Roman Catholic dioceses in Africa